"The Physician's Tale" is one of The Canterbury Tales, written by Geoffrey Chaucer in the 14th century.

It is a domestic drama about the relationship between a daughter and her father, based on a tale from the Histories of Titus Livius and retold in The Romance of the Rose, as well as John Gower's Confessio Amantis, which Chaucer drew on for inspiration, and the biblical story of Jephtha. 

Although difficult to date like most of Chaucer's tales, the Physician's tale is usually regarded as an early work of Chaucer probably written before much of the rest of the Canterbury Tales was begun. The long digression on governesses possibly alludes to a historical event and may serve to date it: in 1386 Elizabeth, the daughter of John of Gaunt, eloped to France with John Hastings, 3rd Earl of Pembroke. Elizabeth's governess was Katherine Swynford, who was also Gaunt's mistress and later wife. Chaucer's words on the virtues of governesses were potentially influenced by this.

The story is considered one of the moral tales, along with the Parson's tale and the Knight's tale. However, the fate of Virginius renders questionable the moral assertion at the story's end. The Host enjoys the tale and feels for the daughter but asks the Pardoner for a more merry tale.  The Pardoner obliges and his tale has a similar but contrasting moral message.

Characters
Virginius – the father of the fourteen-year-old Virginia and a knight, who kills his daughter rather than give her up to the corrupt judge Appius.
Virginia – the daughter of Virginius; not wishing to give herself to Appius, consents to her father's plan.
Appius – a corrupt judge and the main antagonist of the tale; lusts after Virginia and concocts a plan in order to acquire her through legal means.
Claudius – A "churl" under Appius's employ; instructed to claim in court that Virginia is actually a slave whom Virginius abducted.
Unnamed but mentioned characters include Virginia's mother and the thousand citizens who rise up against Appius.

Plot
The tale is a version of a story related both by the Roman historian Livy and in the 13th-century Roman de la Rose. The story opens with a description of the noble Virginius and his daughter, the beautiful, virtuous Virginia. One day, Virginia accompanies her mother to the city on an errand and is spotted by a judge, whose name is later revealed to be Appius, who decides he must have her to himself. It is then that Appius concocts a scheme to take her legally: he contacts a local peasant, named Claudius, who has a reputation for being both bold and cunning and asks for assistance in the matter. Claudius accepts and is rewarded handsomely. Some time later, Claudius appears before Appius in court to file a complaint against Virginius, saying he has witnesses of his misdeeds. Appius declares that he cannot try Virginius without him being present. Virginius is called to the court and Claudius begins his accusation: Virginius stole one of Claudius' servants one night while she was young and raised her as his daughter. He then implores Appius to return his slave to him to which Appius agrees, refusing to listen Virginius' defense.

Following the sentence, Virginius returns home with a "deathlike" face and calls his daughter into the hall. He then informs Virginia of the events that have transpired and offers her two choices: to be shamed by Appius or to die at her father's hand. Recalling the story of Jephthah, Virginia asks for time to lament her position for a moment before consenting to death by her father's blade. Virginius then beheads Virginia and brings her head to Appius in court. Upon seeing Virginia's severed head, Appius orders that Virginius be hanged immediately. However, a thousand people burst into the room in response and defend Virginius, having heard of Claudius' false charges and reasoning that Appius had arranged it based on the judge's lecherous reputation. The crowd arrests Appius and throws him in prison where he commits suicide. Claudius is set to be hanged with the others who had helped Appius in his scheme but Virginius, in a moment of clemency, asks that the peasant be exiled instead. The tale then ends with the Physician warning of the repercussions of sin.

Themes
Recurring themes in the tale include consent and sacrifice. 

On the subject of consent, many critics have noted that in the original versions of the story Virginia was not given the choice of whether she could live or not. For example, in her essay "The Creation of Consent in the Physician's Tale", Lianna Farber points out the detail of Virginia's consent to death "appears neither in Chaucer's stated source, Livy's history, which Chaucer may or may not have known, nor in his unstated source, Jean de Meun's Roman de la Rose, which Chaucer most certainly did know" meaning that Chaucer added the detail to the story himself. Chaucer's goal in giving Virginia a choice in his version of the tale is unclear. Farber also points out a flaw in Virginius's ultimatum of death or dishonor: "these alternatives are problematic because there would presumably be many other ways to deal with the situation: Virginia could run away; she could go into hiding; Virginius could stall for time while he called together all their friends who were pointedly mentioned when we were introduced to Virginius; and on and on." 

Some argue that the purpose of Virginia's death is to highlight Virginius's ineptitude as a father. Farber states that Virginius's ultimatum to his daughter would not have been seen as the proper action for a father to take: "it turns out, audiences of the story other than the Host tend to agree, that this is bad governance." However, Farber also argues in the other direction saying that "the responsibility does not lie entirely with Virginius: Virginia embraces her father's logic as well as his power and, voicing both, consents to her own death."

Many critics and theorists have also analyzed the value and impact of Virginia's sacrifice in the tale. Daniel T. Kline, in his essay "Jephthah's Daughter and Chaucer's Virginia: The Critique of Sacrifice in The Physician's Tale", asserts that "the Physician's Tale should be read in light not of traditional hagiographical narrative, in which sacrificial death is socially valorized and theologically naturalized, but in view of the account of Jephthah's daughter in Judges 11, a Biblical tale in which the daughter's sacrifice is neither lauded nor condemned." In short, Kline states that Virginia's sacrifice was not something noble but rather a tragic result of a series of unfortunate events.

Titus Andronicus
Shakespeare's Titus Andronicus pays homage to this tale. After Lavinia is raped and mutilated, her father Titus kills her, arguing that she "should not survive her shame". He then compares himself to Virginius.

References

External links

"The Physician's Tale", middle-english hypertext with glossary and side-by-side middle english and modern english
Read "The Physician's Tale" with interlinear translation
Modern Translation of the Physician's Tale and Other Resources at eChaucer
"The Physician's Tale" – a plain-English retelling for non-scholars.

The Canterbury Tales
Filicide in fiction